Bubble Boy is a 2001 American black comedy film directed by Blair Hayes, starring Jake Gyllenhaal in the title role. It was inspired by the 1976 movie The Boy in the Plastic Bubble. A musical by the same name was written by the same authors and first performed in 2008.

Plot
Born without an immune system, Jimmy Livingston lives in a sterilized dome in his bedroom in his home in California, earning him the nickname "Bubble Boy" by his neighbors. His overbearing and devout Christian mother only exposes him to Highlights magazine and Land of the Lost for entertainment. When he is a teenager, Jimmy is immediately taken with Chloe who moves in next door and the two become friends, despite his mother's discouragement. When Chloe leaves for Niagara Falls to marry her boyfriend Mark in three days' time, Jimmy realizes that Chloe cares for him and builds a mobile bubble suit, determined to stop the wedding.

Along the way, Jimmy is picked up by a cult called Bright and Shiny but is abandoned in the desert when he offends them. He finds a new ride with Slim, a biker who speaks fondly of his old flame "Wildfire" upon hearing Jimmy's story. The Livingstons pursue Jimmy, along with the cult members whose leader Gil believes "The Round One" to be the group's messiah. Jimmy leaves a distracted Slim behind in Las Vegas and continues on using a scooter he wins at a casino. Encountering his parents on the road, Jimmy is struck by their vehicle and bounced aboard a train belonging to Dr. Phreak, who shows "freaks" to the public for money. When Phreak tries to recruit Jimmy, Jimmy knocks him unconscious which allows the freaks to go their own way. They choose to trail Jimmy along with the other parties in pursuit.

Jimmy is picked up by Pushpop, an Indian ice cream truck driver, but has to continue on foot when they hit a cow on the road. Winning $500 in a mud wrestling competition, Jimmy pays taxi driver Pappy for a ride but is cornered by the cult members. He slips away during the group's skirmish with the freaks and Slim's gang. After Pappy appears to have died at the wheel, Jimmy tries to call Chloe from a gas station in New York only to reach her fiancé Mark, who rudely convinces him that Chloe doesn't love him. Discouraged, Jimmy intends to return home with his parents, but encouragement and an opening provided by his father Morton allows him to escape on a plane piloted by Pappy's twin brother Pippy.

When Pippy becomes lifeless over Niagara Falls Jimmy survives the fall and arrives at the church in time to stop the wedding. Abandoning his bubble suit, he embraces and kisses Chloe before collapsing. At Morton's insistence, Mrs. Livingston confesses that he had already developed an immune system when he was four and has been perfectly fine all along. She had kept him isolated only due to her overprotective nature.

Jimmy and Chloe are married with all the people encountered during his adventure in attendance. Recognized as the former "Wildfire", Mrs. Livingston re-embraces her rebellious side and prepares to depart with Slim on his bike along with Morton. Jimmy and Chloe discover Pippy and Pappyboth of whom merely fell asleep instead of dyingas they ride off to begin their honeymoon.

Cast
 Jake Gyllenhaal as Jimmy Livingston
 Swoosie Kurtz as Mrs. Livingston aka "Wildfire"
 Marley Shelton as Chloe
 Danny Trejo as Slim
 John Carroll Lynch as Morton Livingston
 Verne Troyer as Dr. Phreak
 Dave Sheridan as Mark
 Brian George as Pushpop
 Patrick Cranshaw as Pappy and Pippy
 Ever Carradine as Lisa
 Beetlejuice as Lil' Zip
 Fabio Lanzoni as Gil 
 Zach Galifianakis as Bus stop man
 Arden Myrin as Lorraine
 Pablo Schreiber as Todd
 Matthew McGrory as Human Sasquatch / Clark
 Stacy Keibler as Working girl
 Madajah McCullum O'Hearn as Red Hot

Reception
The film opened #13 at the U.S. Box office, taking in US$2,038,349 in its opening weekend.

On Rotten Tomatoes it has an approval rating of 31% based on 84 reviews, with an average rating of 3.76/10. The site's consensus states that "Bubble Boy bounces along with lame, offensive jokes that are more tasteless than funny." On Metacritic it has a score of 41% based on reviews from 21 critics, indicating "mixed or average reviews".
The film has been considered a "cult comedy." Audiences polled by CinemaScore gave the film an average grade of "B" on an A+ to F scale.

Controversy 
The film was the center of a brief controversy for downplaying the effects of severe combined immunodeficiency (SCID) for the purposes of comedy, which affected the life of David Vetter, another child who lived in a bubble and died at age twelve.

Musical adaptation

In 2013, Cinco Paul and Ken Daurio adapted Bubble Boy into a stage musical featuring original songs, for which an original cast recording was released on Ghostlight Records in 2017 featuring A.J. Holmes, Alice Ripley and Richard Kind, produced by Paul, Justin Goldner & Kurt Deutsch.

References

External links
 
 
 

2000s road movies
2001 black comedy films
2001 comedy films
2001 directorial debut films
2001 films
American black comedy films
American road movies
Films produced by Beau Flynn
Films scored by John Ottman
Films set in New York (state)
Films set in the Las Vegas Valley
Films shot in Los Angeles
Films shot in the Las Vegas Valley
Films with screenplays by Cinco Paul and Ken Daurio
Touchstone Pictures films
2000s English-language films
2000s American films
Films about disability